Disco biscuits or Disco Biscuits may refer to:

 Disco Biscuits, an American band
 Disco biscuits, slang for several recreational drugs:
 Methaqualone or Quaalude, popularised in the 1960s
 MDMA or ecstasy, popularised in the 1980s